Jach'a Jawira (Aymara jach'a big, great, jawira river, "great river", Hispanicized spelling Jachcha Jahuira) is a Bolivian river east of Poopó Lake in the Potosí Department, Rafael Bustillo Province,  Uncía Municipality.

See also 
 Jach'a Jawira (Chuqi Uta)

References

Rivers of Potosí Department